The second Al-Maliki government was the government of Iraq from 22 December 2010 to 8 September 2014. This followed a record length of time since the Iraqi parliamentary election, 2010 which resulted in Prime Minister Nouri al-Maliki retaining his position and forming a national unity government including all main blocs that had been elected to parliament.

This Al-Maliki II Cabinet was succeeded by the government of Prime Minister  Haider al-Abadi (2014–2018).

The Council of Representatives of Iraq unanimously approved al-Maliki's new government. Twenty-nine ministers were approved, including Shias, Sunnis and Kurds. In reaction, al-Maliki issued his new government's programme and also vowed to make Iraq a "truly democratic state that respects human rights." However, he criticised the lack of any female nominees and warned that "given the circumstances it has been created under, this government does not satisfy the people nor the needs of our country. The effort and the will to make it work in the best possible way it can is there." 

Al-Maliki took the role as acting Minister of Defence, Interior and National Security "until appropriate candidates were found." Former Oil Minister Hussein al-Shahristani became Deputy Prime Minister for Energy. The former Deputy Prime Minister Rafi al-Issawi became Finance Minister. Foreign Minister Hoshyar Zebari will continue in his post. Saleh al-Mutlaq was also controversially appointed a Deputy Prime Minister after a ban on him taking part in politics as a former Baathist. Thirteen more ministerial posts had acting ministers as al-Maliki said "The formation of national unity government in Iraq is a difficult and hard task because we need to find place in the government for all those who participated and won in the elections."

Full list of ministers

References 

Cabinets of Iraq
2010 establishments in Iraq